The Australian Champion Filly or Mare is awarded to the Thoroughbred filly or mare who is voted to be the superior female racehorse within an Australian racing season.
  
This award began as Australian Champion Mare; however, it was expanded to include fillies from the 1998 - 1999 season.

Other Australian Thoroughbred awards
Australian Champion Racehorse of the Year
Australian Champion Two Year Old
Australian Champion Three Year Old
Australian Champion Sprinter
Australian Champion Middle Distance Racehorse
Australian Champion Stayer
Australian Champion International Performer
Australian Champion Jumper
Australian Champion Trainer

See also
 List of millionaire racehorses in Australia

References

Australian Thoroughbred racing awards